During 1994, tropical cyclones formed within seven different tropical cyclone basins, located within various parts of the Atlantic, Pacific and Indian Oceans. During the year, a total of 124 systems formed with 91 of these developing further and were named by the responsible warning centre. The deadliest tropical cyclone was Typhoon Fred, which caused 1,248 fatalities in China, while the costliest was Tropical Storm Sharon, which caused an estimated $5.27 billion USD in damage after striking Hong Kong, China and the Philippines. Five Category 5 tropical cyclones formed in 1994.

Tropical cyclone activity in each basin is under the authority of an RSMC. The National Hurricane Center (NHC) is responsible for tropical cyclones in the North Atlantic and East Pacific. The Central Pacific Hurricane Center (CPHC) is responsible for tropical cyclones in the Central Pacific. Both the NHC and CPHC are subdivisions of the National Weather Service. Activity in the West Pacific is monitored by the Japan Meteorological Agency (JMA). Systems in the North Indian Ocean are monitored by the India Meteorological Department (IMD). The Météo-France located in Réunion (MFR) monitors tropical activity in the South-West Indian Ocean. The Australian region is monitored by five TCWCs that are under the coordination of the Australian Bureau of Meteorology (BOM). Similarly, the South Pacific is monitored by both the Fiji Meteorological Service (FMS) and the Meteorological Service of New Zealand Limited. Other, unofficial agencies that provide additional guidance in tropical cyclone monitoring include the Philippine Atmospheric, Geophysical and Astronomical Services Administration (PAGASA) and the Joint Typhoon Warning Center (JTWC).

Global conditions and hydrological summary

Summary

Systems

January

February

February was an extremely inactive month, featuring only 4 systems, of which all were named. Hollanda was the first storm of the month, peaking as a Category-3 equivalent cyclone and causing strong wind gusts and heavy rainfall on the Mascarene Islands and causing 2 deaths. Ivy and Julita formed afterwards, with Ivy peaking as a Category-3 equivalent cyclone and Julita making landfall on Madagascar. Cyclone Theodore was the last and strongest storm of the month, crossing over into the South Pacific basin and peaking as a Category-4 equivalent cyclone.

March

April

May

May was the least active month of 1994, featuring only 3 systems, of which only 1 was named. Typhoon Page, the first and strongest storm of the month, formed on May 12 and stayed out to sea, peaking as a Category-2 equivalent cyclone. Deling formed on May 25, causing 5 deaths in the Philippines. A tropical depression was the last storm of the month.

June

November

December

Global effects

Notes
2 Only systems that formed either on or after January 1, 1994 are counted in the seasonal totals.
3 Only systems that formed either before or on December 31, 1994 are counted in the seasonal totals.4 The wind speeds for this tropical cyclone/basin are based on the IMD Scale which uses 3-minute sustained winds.
5 The wind speeds for this tropical cyclone/basin are based on the Saffir Simpson Scale which uses 1-minute sustained winds.
6 The wind speeds for this tropical cyclone/basin are based on Météo-France which uses wind gusts.

References

External links 

Regional Specialized Meteorological Centers
 US National Hurricane Center – North Atlantic, Eastern Pacific
 Central Pacific Hurricane Center – Central Pacific
 Japan Meteorological Agency – NW Pacific
 India Meteorological Department – Bay of Bengal and the Arabian Sea
 Météo-France – La Reunion – South Indian Ocean from 30°E to 90°E
 Fiji Meteorological Service – South Pacific west of 160°E, north of 25° S

Tropical Cyclone Warning Centers
 Meteorology, Climatology, and Geophysical Agency of Indonesia – South Indian Ocean from 90°E to 141°E, generally north of 10°S
 Australian Bureau of Meteorology (TCWC's Perth, Darwin & Brisbane) – South Indian Ocean & South Pacific Ocean from 90°E to 160°E, generally south of 10°S
 Papua New Guinea National Weather Service – South Pacific Ocean from 141°E to 160°E, generally north of 10°S
 Meteorological Service of New Zealand Limited – South Pacific west of 160°E, south of 25°S

Tropical cyclones by year
1994 Atlantic hurricane season
1994 Pacific hurricane season
1994 Pacific typhoon season
1994 North Indian Ocean cyclone season
1993–94 Australian region cyclone season
1994–95 Australian region cyclone season
1993–94 South Pacific cyclone season
1994–95 South Pacific cyclone season
1993–94 South-West Indian Ocean cyclone season
1994–95 South-West Indian Ocean cyclone season
1994-related lists